The Quaal River is a river in the Kitimat Ranges of the Coast Mountains in British Columbia, Canada, flowing south into Kitkiata Inlet in the North Coast region.

Indian reserves

See also
List of British Columbia rivers

References

Rivers of the North Coast of British Columbia
Rivers of the Kitimat Ranges